South Oxfordshire District Council, a non-metropolitan district council in Oxfordshire, England is elected every four years.

Following the boundary changes in 2003, 48 councillors were elected from 29 wards. As a result of The South Oxfordshire (Electoral Changes) Order 2014, the number of councillors/wards reduced to 36/21 from the 2015 local elections.

Political control
Since the first election to the council in 1973 political control of the council has been held by the following parties:

Leadership
The leaders of the council since 2003 have been:

Council elections
1973 Wallingford District Council election
1976 South Oxfordshire District Council election
1979 South Oxfordshire District Council election (Some new ward boundaries & district boundary changes also took place)
1983 South Oxfordshire District Council election (New ward boundaries)
1987 South Oxfordshire District Council election (District boundary changes took place but the number of seats remained the same)
1991 South Oxfordshire District Council election (Some new ward boundaries & district boundary changes also took place)
1995 South Oxfordshire District Council election
1999 South Oxfordshire District Council election
2003 South Oxfordshire District Council election (New ward boundaries reduced the number of seats by 2)
2007 South Oxfordshire District Council election
2011 South Oxfordshire District Council election
2015 South Oxfordshire District Council election (New ward boundaries)
2019 South Oxfordshire District Council election

Election results

By-election results

1995-1999

1999-2003

2003-2007

2007-2011

2011-2015

2015-2019

2019-2023

References

By-election results

External links
South Oxfordshire District Council

 
South Oxfordshire District
Council elections in Oxfordshire
District council elections in England